Gilit Mesopotamian Arabic, also known as Iraqi Arabic, Mesopotamian Gelet Arabic, or simply Mesopotamian Arabic is one of the two main varieties of Mesopotamian Arabic, together with North Mesopotamian Arabic.

Relationship to North Mesopotamian

Dialects

References